Fred Foster Rhodes (21 March 1904 – 1988) was an English professional footballer whose career as a centre forward was spent at Bradford City.

References

1904 births
1988 deaths
People from Gomersal
English footballers
Association football forwards
Liversedge F.C. players
Bradford City A.F.C. players
Poole Town F.C. players
English Football League players